Cecina may refer to:

 Cecina (meat), a Spanish and Mexican culinary specialty made of beef
 Cecina (gastropod), a genus of freshwater snails in the family Pomatiopsidae
 Cecina, Tuscany, Italy
 Caecinia gens, an ancient Roman family
 Farinata, a Tuscan culinary specialty made of chickpea flour

See also
 Caecina (disambiguation)
 Čečina (disambiguation)